Lulsundet is a residential area in Luleå, Sweden. It had 984 inhabitants in 2010.

References

External links
Lulsundet at Luleå Municipality

Luleå